Tafila Wind Farm is a 117 MW wind farm located in Tafilah Governorate, Jordan. The farm consists of 38 turbines and was inaugurated in December 2015 by King Abdullah II. The project, which cost $287 million, is the first wind farm in the Kingdom and the region. The venture aims to diversify energy resources in Jordan and boost the renewable energy contribution in the total energy mix.

Gallery

See also 

 List of wind farms in Jordan
Shams Ma'an Power Plant

References 

Energy infrastructure completed in 2015
Wind farms in Jordan
Tafilah Governorate